The 2022 Pulitzer Prizes were awarded by the Pulitzer Prize Board for work during the 2021 calendar year on May 9, 2022. The awards highlighted coverage of major stories in the U.S. that year, including the January 6 United States Capitol attack, for which The Washington Post won the Public Service prize, considered the most prestigious award. The New York Times received three awards, the most of any publication. Insider received its first Pulitzer.

The Editorial Cartooning prize was superseded in 2022 by the revamped category of Illustrated Reporting and Commentary. No winner was selected in the former category in 2021, which drew controversy.

Prizes
Winners and finalists for the prizes are listed below, with the winners marked in bold.

Journalism

Letters, drama, and music 

{| class="wikitable" style="float:left; float:none;"
!History
|-
|Covered with Night, by Nicole Eustace (Liveright/Norton)|-
|Cuba: An American History, by Ada Ferrer (Scribner)|-
|Until Justice Be Done: America's First Civil Rights Movement, from the Revolution to Reconstruction, by Kate Masur (W. W. Norton & Company)
|-
|}
{| class="wikitable" style="float:left; float:none;"
!Poetry
|-
|frank: sonnets by Diane Seuss (Graywolf Press)|-
|Refractive Africa: Ballet of the Forgotten, by Will Alexander (New Directions)
|-
|Yellow Rain, by Mai Der Vang (Graywolf Press)
|-
|}
{| class="wikitable" style="float:left; float:none;"
!General Nonfiction
|-
|Invisible Child: Poverty, Survival & Hope in an American City, by Andrea Elliott (Random House)|-
|Home, Land, Security: Deradicalization and the Journey Back from Extremism, by Carla Power (One World/Random House)
|-
|The Family Roe: An American Story, by Joshua Prager (W. W. Norton & Company)
|-
|}
{| class="wikitable" style="float:left; float:none;"
!Biography
|-
|Chasing Me to My Grave: An Artist's Memoir of the Jim Crow South, by the late Winfred Rembert as told to Erin I. Kelly (Bloomsbury)|-
|Pessoa: A Biography, by Richard Zenith (Liveright/Norton)
|-
|The Doctors Blackwell: How Two Pioneering Sisters Brought Medicine to Women and Women to Medicine, by Janice P. Nimura (W. W. Norton & Company)
|-
|}
{| class="wikitable" style="float:left; float:none;"
!Fiction
|-
|The Netanyahus: An Account of a Minor and Ultimately Even Negligible Episode in the History of a Very Famous Family, by Joshua Cohen (New York Review Books)'''
|-
|Monkey Boy, by Francisco Goldman (Grove Press)
|-
|Palmares, by Gayl Jones (Beacon Press)
|-
|}

Special citation 
A special citation was awarded to the journalists of Ukraine for their coverage of the 2022 Russian invasion of Ukraine. The citation reads:

 Reception 
Tom Jones of Poynter was unsurprised by the recognition of The New York Times and The Washington Post, which  he described as "what seems like an annual rite of passage". He highlighted the success of local outlets such as the Tampa Bay Times and said Quanta Magazine's win for explanatory reporting was "what might be the most unexpected — and again that doesn't mean undeserved — prize of the day". Of the process he wrote, "I'm struck by how the Pulitzer Prize judges took their responsibility with the utmost diligence — recognizing a wide array of outlets and journalists. And congratulations to the Pulitzer juries for trimming down each category to finalists that were as varied as they were strong." He called the omission of The Wall Street Journal's Facebook Files a snub.

Remarking on the new category of Illustrated Reporting and Commentary, The Beat writer Heidi MacDonald said that the revamped category "says much about the state of media and cartooning", and "gives room to consider longer works... even on beyond to TikTok, in theory".

On May 11, 2022, two days after Pulitzer Prizes were awarded to The New York Times and Los Angeles Times photojournalist Marcus Yam for their coverage of the regime change in Afghanistan, The Diplomat published an article criticizing media coverage of the country and noted that violence was in fact rising in Afghanistan, stating "Afghanistan may have fallen out of international headlines, but violent trends are once again on the rise" and that there was currently "intense infighting between various Taliban factions and interests." Data collected by The Diplomats affiliates at Afghan Peace Watch (APW) and Armed Conflict Location & Event Data Project (ACLED) showed that violence in Afghanistan escalated between September 2021 and March 2022. The same day, American Prospect'' reporter Emran Feroz stated that "the War on Terror continues" and noted that foreign drones were still operating in the country.

References

External links 

 List of winners from the Pulitzer Prize

Columbia University Graduate School of Journalism
2022 literary awards
2022 awards in the United States
2022 music awards
May 2022 events in the United States